Weather modification in North America has been taking place since at least the 1950s.  Programs related to this field have been authorized by the governments of both the United States and Canada.

Alberta Hail Project

The Alberta Hail Project was a research project sponsored by the Alberta Research Council and Environment Canada to study hailstorm physics and dynamics in order to design and test means for suppressing hail. It ran from 1956 until 1985. The main instrument in this research was an S-band circularly polarized weather radar located at the Red Deer Industrial Airport in central Alberta, Canada.

Project Stormfury

Project Stormfury was an attempt to weaken tropical cyclones by flying aircraft into them and seeding with silver iodide. The project was run by the United States Government from 1962 to 1983.

In Southern California
Weather modification via cloud seeding has a long history in perennially dry Southern California. Santa Barbara County has been cloud seeding with both ground-based machines and dedicated cloud-seeding airplanes since the 1980s. In 2016, Los Angeles County rebooted its cloud seeding program (with ground-based machines) for the first time after 2002.

See also

 Weather modification
 Cloud seeding

References

External links

 
Meteorology research and field projects
Climate of North America